Ethan Wolf (born November 7, 1995) is an American football tight end for the DC Defenders of the XFL. He played college football at Tennessee.

Early years
Wolf played high school football at Minster High School.

College career
Wolf started 11 of his 12 games in his freshman year, becoming the first true freshman to start a season opener for Tennessee, finishing the year with 23 catches for 212 yards. In his sophomore year he started a further 12 games, with 23 catches for 301 yards and two touchdowns. As a junior, he recorded 22 receptions for 247 yards and two touchdowns. He is 4th all-time in receiving yards for a tight end in Tennessee history.

Wolf's younger brother Eli, later joined him on the Tennessee football team, where they both played tight end.

Collegiate statistics

Professional career

Tennessee Titans
Wolf was signed by the Tennessee Titans as an undrafted free agent on April 28, 2018. He was waived during final roster cuts on September 1, 2018.

Green Bay Packers
Wolf signed to the Green Bay Packers' practice squad on October 30, 2018.

Carolina Panthers
Wolf signed to the Carolina Panthers following a try-out on May 13, 2019. He was waived by Carolina on August 1, 2019.

Jacksonville Jaguars
Wolf signed for the Jacksonville Jaguars on August 11, 2019. He was waived by Jacksonville on August 30, 2019.

Green Bay Packers (second stint)
Wolf signed to the Packers' practice squad on October 8, 2019. He was released from the practice squad on October 16, 2019.

Los Angeles Rams
Wolf signed for the Los Angeles Rams' practice squad on December 4, 2019. He signed a reserve/future contract with the Rams on December 31, 2019. He was waived by the Rams on July 26, 2020.

New Orleans Saints
Wolf signed to the New Orleans Saints on August 19, 2020. He was waived in final roster cuts on September 5, 2020.

Indianapolis Colts
Wolf signed to the Indianapolis Colts' practice squad on September 22, 2020. He was released from the practice squad on October 6, 2020.

New Orleans Saints (second stint)
Wolf signed to the Saints' practice squad on November 4, 2020. He signed a reserve/future contract on January 19, 2021. He was waived in final roster cuts on August 31, 2021, and signed to the practice squad on September 2, 2021. He was elevated to the active roster on December 12, 2021, ahead of the Saints' Week 14 game against the New York Jets, making his NFL debut in the process. He signed a reserve/future contract with the Saints on January 12, 2022. He was waived on May 13, 2022.

DC Defenders 
On November 17, 2022, Wolf was drafted by the DC Defenders of the XFL.

References

External links

Tennessee Volunteers bio

1995 births
Living people
Players of American football from Ohio
American football tight ends
Tennessee Volunteers football players
Tennessee Titans players
Green Bay Packers players
Carolina Panthers players
Jacksonville Jaguars players
Los Angeles Rams players
New Orleans Saints players
Indianapolis Colts players
DC Defenders players